Košice II is a district in the Košice Region of eastern Slovakia, in the city of Košice. It is bordered by the Košice I, Košice IV and Košice-okolie districts. Until 1920, the district was part of the Hungarian county of Abaúj-Torna.

Boroughs

References 

Districts of Slovakia
 
Geography of Košice Region